This is a list of people who served as Lord Lieutenant of Stirlingshire in Scotland. The office was abolished in 1975, and replaced with the Lord Lieutenant of Stirling and Falkirk.

 David Erskine, 9th Earl of Buchan 1713 – 1715
 incomplete before 1794
 James Graham, 3rd Duke of Montrose 17 March 1794 – 30 December 1836
 George Abercromby, 2nd Baron Abercromby 19 January 1837 – 15 February 1843
 James Graham, 4th Duke of Montrose 27 February 1843 – 30 December 1874
 Charles Murray, 7th Earl of Dunmore 16 February 1875 – 1885
 Douglas Graham, 5th Duke of Montrose 18 July 1885 – 10 December 1925
 George Younger, 1st Viscount Younger of Leckie 14 January 1926 – 29 April 1929
 William Laurence Pullar 15 November 1929 – 1936
 Sir George Stirling, 9th Baronet 29 October 1936 – 1 May 1949
 Sir Ian Bolton, 2nd Baronet 8 July 1949 – 1964
 Edward Younger, 3rd Viscount Younger of Leckie 24 February 1964 – 1975
 Younger of Leckie became Lord Lieutenant of Stirling and Falkirk

References

Stirlingshire
 
Politics of Stirling (council area)
History of Stirling (council area)
People associated with Stirling (council area)